The deputy secretary of transportation advises and assists the secretary of transportation in the supervision and direction of the Department of Transportation (DOT). The deputy secretary would succeed the secretary in his or her absence, sickness, or unavailability.

List of deputy secretaries of transportation

References

External links
 Department of Transportation

Transportation